"Pulling Punches" is a song by the English singer-songwriter David Sylvian. It was released in October 1984 as the third single from his debut solo album Brilliant Trees.

Track listings
7"
 "Pulling Punches" – 3:02
 "Backwaters" – 4:49

12"
 "Pulling Punches" – 5:01
 "Backwaters" – 4:49

Chart positions

References

External links

1984 songs
1984 singles
David Sylvian songs
Songs written by David Sylvian